Claudiosaurus (claudus is Latin for 'lameness' and saurus means 'lizard') is an extinct genus of diapsid reptiles from the Permian Sakamena Formation of the Morondava Basin, Madagascar. The pattern of the vertebrate, girle, and limbs indicates that Claudiosaurus and Thadeosaurus share a common ancestor.

History and discovery 
Claudiosaurus is known from the Sakamena Formation of Madagascar. Claudiosaurus is found from the Late Permian. Although a paper mentions that they have been also found in Early Triassic deposits of Madagascar, citation does not mention that Claudiosaurus is from Triassic.

Biology and description 

Claudiosaurus was one of the first members of the Neodiapsida, a group of reptiles containing diapsids more derived than the primitive Araeoscelidia. It is presumed to have been partially oceanic, living its life in a way similar to the modern marine iguana. The main reason for this theory is that the skeleton included substantial amounts cartilage, instead of bone, indicating it had trouble supporting its weight on land. In particular, the sternum was poorly developed, which would have made walking difficult out of water. Instead, it probably swam by undulating its body and tail, and holding its legs close to the body to increase streamlining. A more recent study however indicates that its vertebral column tail and leg proportions are closer to those of terrestrial reptiles, though it is noted that marine iguanas similarly only differ from terrestrial counterparts very subtly. The mean vertebral is approximately twice of Hovasaurus. Claudiosaurus have a more slender tail than Hovasaurus. The frontal contributes the dorsal orbital margin. This prevents the prefrontal from contacting the post frontal. The post frontal is ventrally expanded posteriorly and contributes to the orbital rim. The anterior process of the pterygoid is straight. The closest skull comparison can be with the genus Anarosaurus. Claudiosaurus differs from Acerosodontosaurus and Hovasaurus in the presence of a proportionately long neck.

Behavior

Locomotion 
It is theorized that Claudiosaurus was semi-aquatic. The discovery of pachyostotic thickening of the limb bones and vertebrae supports this theory. The margins of contact in the carpals are poorly defined and therefore retained a lot of cartilage, providing a greater ‘degree of flexibility’ that would be beneficial for swimming.

Feeding ecology 
There is evidence of aquatic feeding habits. Supporting this is the small size of the skull, nature of the palate and marginal dentition and the long neck.

Classification 
Claudiosaurus is recovered as a relative of turtles by Li et al. (2018), forming a clade with the basal neodiapsid Acerosodontosaurus. Although another study in 2020 specifically disputed these conclusions.

Paleoenvironment 
The Lower Sakamamena Formation was deposited in a wetland environment situated within a North-South orientated rift valley, perhaps similar to Lake Tanganyika. The climate at the time of deposition was temperate, warm, and humid, with seasonal rainfall and possible monsoons. Flora from the formation includes the equisetalean Schizoneura, the glossopterid gymnosperm Glossopteris, and seed fern Lepidopteris. Other vertebrates known from the Lower Sakamena Formation include the palaeoniscoid fish Atherstonia, the procolophonid parareptile Barasaurus, the gliding weigeltisaurid reptile Coelurosauravus, the neodiapsids Hovasaurus, Thadeosaurus, and Acerodontosaurus, fragments of rhinesuchid temnospondyls, an indeterminate theriodont therapsid and the dicynodont Oudenodon.

References

Further reading 
 
 
 
 
 

Prehistoric neodiapsids
Lopingian reptiles of Africa
Lopingian genera
Fossils of Madagascar
Permian Madagascar
Fossil taxa described in 1981
Prehistoric reptile genera